The Federal Protective Service (FSO) of the Russian Federation is a federal government agency mandated by the relevant laws with the tasks related to the protection of many high-ranking state officials including the President of Russia, as well as certain federal properties such as the Kremlin.

Federal  Protective Service of the Russian Federation

Medals

Decorations

Service of Special Communications and Information (Spetsviaz)
On March 11, 2003 Russian president Vladimir Putin reorganized the Federal Agency for Government Communication and Information FAPSI from an independent service into the Service of Special Communications and Information (Spetsviaz) of the FSB.  On August 7, 2004, Spetsviaz was incorporated as a structural sub unit of the Federal Protective Service (FSO).

Medals

Decorations

See also
Federal Protective Service (Russia)
Kremlin Regiment
Federal Security Service (Russia)
FAPSI
Awards and decorations of the Russian Federation
Ministerial Awards of the Russian Federation
List of awards of independent services of the Russian Federation
Honorary titles of the Russian Federation
Awards and decorations of the Soviet Union

References

Other sources
Official awards page of the Federal Protective Service of the Russian Federation 
 Internet Portal Russian Symbols In Russian
 Russian Legal Library - Decrees and Regulations Consultant Plus In Russian
 
  GARANT Legal Information Portal Latest Ministerial Orders - In Russian

External links
Official website of the Federal Protective Service of the Russian Federation 
Official website of the Federal Security Service of the Russian Federation 

Orders, decorations, and medals of Russia
Russian awards
Military awards and decorations of Russia
Law enforcement agencies of Russia